Oumar Bakari (born 30 April 1980) is a retired French footballer defender.

He signed for Charleroi following his contract expiration with Stade Malherbe Caen in November 2006, becoming the sixth player of African descent to sign for the Belgian side.

Bakari previously played for OGC Nice in Ligue 1 as well as ES Wasquehal, Stade Lavallois and Stade Malherbe Caen in Ligue 2.

See also
 Sub-Saharan African community of Paris

References

External links
 
 

1980 births
Living people
French sportspeople of Ivorian descent
Association football defenders
French footballers
Le Mans FC players
OGC Nice players
Stade Lavallois players
Stade Malherbe Caen players
R. Charleroi S.C. players
FC Gueugnon players
UJA Maccabi Paris Métropole players
Wasquehal Football players